Bagshaw is an English surname. Notable people with the surname include:

Amy Bagshaw (b. 1988), international gymnast
Christopher Bagshaw (1552–1625?), English academic and Roman Catholic priest
Edward Bagshaw (disambiguation), several people
Elizabeth Bagshaw (1881–1982), Canadian doctor and medical director of the first birth control clinic in Canada
Enoch Bagshaw (1884–1930), American football player and coach
Frederick Bagshaw (1878–1966), English-Canadian lawyer
Geoffrey Bagshaw, Australian anthropologist who worked with Yolngu people on the 2003 heritage listing of Yalangbara, Northern Territory
Harry Bagshaw (1859–1927), English cricketer
Henry Bagshaw (divine) (1632–1709), English divine
James Bagshaw (1874–1941), English footballer
James Bagshaw (1885–1966), English footballer
Jeremy Bagshaw (b. 1992), Canadian swimmer
John Bagshaw (1784–1861), British politician
John Stokes Bagshaw (1808–1888), manufacturer of agricultural machinery in South Australia
Kerry Bagshaw (1943–2015), British spy
Margarete Bagshaw (1964–2015), American painter and potter
Paul Bagshaw (b. 1946), Australian rules footballer
Robert John Bagshaw (1803–1873), British politician.
Sally Bagshaw, American politician
Sue Bagshaw (born 1949), New Zealand doctor specialising in the health needs of young people
William Bagshaw (1628–1702), English presbyterian and nonconformist minister, known as the "Apostle of the Peak".

See also
Bagshy

English-language surnames